National Research Irkutsk State Technical University (full name in Russian: Иркутский национальный исследовательский технический университет), formerly Irkutsk State Technical University, is a technical university in Russia.

History
The Specialized Secondary School Irkutsk Mining College was established in 1893, with the principal objective to train mill-diggers for the needs of mining business, and in particular the gold-mining industry.

In 1918 the school was transformed into a Secondary Mining College, and in 1920 it was renamed the Irkutsk Polytechnic College. But the technical school was soon reorganised into the Irkutsk Polytechnic Practical Institute (IrPolPrIn). In August 1923 Irpolprin was reorganized into East Siberian Polytechnic College of regional importance, and later formed the foundation of the Siberian Mining Institute in Irkutsk. The Mining Institute was housed at 3, Lenin Street. S.V. Sergeev, Head of the Geological Survey Department of the Soyuzdoloto Board was appointed as its first Director; Professor G.V. Kliuchanskiy was appointed as his Deputy for Educational and Scientific Work.

Around that time, the Faculty of Workers (rabfak) was opened.

On March 19, 1960, the Mining and Metallurgical Institute was renamed to Polytechnic Institute. It received its designation as a university in 1994 and received its Certificate of Attestation of Educational Institution in 1997 and state accreditation in 1998.

Its scientists made a significant contribution to the economy of the Irkutsk region, East Siberian region, the CIS countries.

On 20 May 2010, IrSTU was named a "National Research University" and approved the program of scientific development in these areas:
 Highly efficient subsoil technologies
 Science-intensive, high-efficiency machinery and equipment manufacturing technologies
 Science intensive life support systems for urban and sparsely populated areas
 Industry of nanosystems and nanomaterials

INRTU structure

Schools
	Siberian School of Geosciences  
	Baikal School of BRICS  
	School of Aircraft Construction, Mechanical Engineering and Transport  
	School of Architecture, Construction and Design  
	School of High Technologies  
	School of Extramural and Evening Education < 
	School of Information Technology and Data Science  
	School of Quantum Physics  
	School of Linguistics and Intercultural Communication  
	School of Subsurface Resource Management  
	School of Economics, Management and Law  
	School of Power Engineering

Divisions
	Branch School in Usolye-Sibirskoye 
	Department of Secondary Vocational Education:
	College of Mechanical Engineering
	Geological Exploration Technical School
	Department of Educational and Production Work
	Professional Internship facilities in Slyudyanka

Scientific and educational centers and institutions within the university
	INRTU Center for Fundamental Research
	Baikal Nanotechnology Center
	Science Library
	Museum of INRTU history
	The Museum of Mineralogy is the largest mineralogical museum beyond the Urals
	Museum of Military Glory
	Museum of the History of Computing

English and Russian-Taught Programs
In 2017, an entirely new school was established within INRTU -  Baikal School of BRICS  -  the only one of its kind in Russia. It is INRTU educational greenfield, where all courses are taught by leading Russian and foreign professors in English.

By October 2021, Baikal School of BRICS has hosted 576 Russian and international students from 15 countries and employed 10 foreign professors and researchers and 39 Russian.

At the beginning of 2021, 1,200 foreign students from 56 countries were studying at INRTU. Students have opportunity to choose degree courses taught in English or Russian, dual degree programs, as well as courses in Russian as a Foreign Language.

INRTU offers English-taught programs in the following majors
Bachelor's degree:
	Artificial Intelligence and Computer Science
	Environmental Science Engineering
	Finance and Accounting
	Sustainable Innovative Economics
	Power Electrical Engineering
	International Business
	Journalism and Media Communication
	Technical Operation of Aviation Equipment
	Business Intelligence and Digital Marketing
	Linguistics and Business Communications
master's degree:
	Digital Power Energy
	Big Data Analytics and Artificial Intelligence
	MBA: Global Management  and  Leadership
	Renewable Energy
	IT in Geology
	Industrial Mathematics and Operations Research

Modern infrastructure and campus
The university campus has 19 dormitories with a total of 4,000 beds in walking distance from the university, 10 main academic buildings, faculty residences, a polyclinic, a health center, a sports complex, and a technology park.

The university campus is well integrated into the urban environment, with shops, cafés, canteens, educational and research facilities, sports facilities, and social infrastructure on the campus.

International rankings

2022 
   1201-1500 Times Higher Education (World University Rankings 2023)
   301-400 Times Higher Education (University Impact Ranking)
   1001+ Times Higher Education (by subject: engineering)
   301-350 QS (Emerging Europe and Central Asia Rating)
   351-400 QS (BRICS University Rankings)
   204 – UI Green Metrics (World University Ranking)
   57 –  Forbes Top 100 Russian university
   47 – Interfax national ranking

2021
	301-350 QS (Emerging Europe and Central Asia Rating)
	351-400 QS (BRICS University Rankings)
	401-600 Times Higher Education (University Impact Ranking)
	225 – UI Green Metrics (World University Ranking)
	63 –  Forbes Top 100 Russian university
	32 – Interfax national ranking

2020 
	251-300 QS (Emerging Europe and Central Asia Rating)
	351-400 QS (BRICS University Rankings)
	601+ Times Higher Education (University Impact Ranking)
	389 – UI Green Metrics (World University Ranking)
	77 –  Forbes Top 100 Russian university
	29 – Interfax national ranking

2019 
	351-400 QS (BRICS University Rankings)
	301+ Times Higher Education (University Impact Ranking)
	540 – UI Green Metrics (World University Ranking)
	34 – Interfax national ranking

Priority 2030 
In 2022, INRTU was one of 106 Russian universities who participated in the Strategic 
Academic Leadership Program.

Irkutsk National Research Technical University was among  46 winners of the additional competition for the Priority 2030 special grant program in the field of "Territorial or Sectoral Leadership".

INRTU is implementing two strategic projects within this Program - i.GeoDesign and Digital Industrial Technologies.

i.GeoDesign aims to change the principles of mining and geological industry formation through the university developments in smart digital geology, usage of drones in exploration, and the university new role in shaping junior business. The second project of Digital Industrial Technologies is associated with the development of advanced manufacturing technologies and raising high-skilled specialists for the Russian industry in the fields of aircraft, energy and 
construction.

The key results of the university's program by 2030 will be: increasing the share of R&D income in the university's budget to 35% and involving at least 30% of students in real-world projects. More than 40% of the university's graduates should be employed by Forbes Global 2000 companies.

Innovation 
Irkutsk National Research Technical University is the leader of the Irkutsk region in innovation sphere. In 2017, the university received the status of a Regional Center of Technological 
Development. Every year INRTU generates more than 60 innovative projects.

The INRTU Technopark was opened in 2010. It became the first scientific and technological complex in Irkutsk region. The total area of the INRTU Technopark is 5260 sq. m. It includes research laboratories, modern teaching, production and corporate research centers, a business incubator, and a large conference room. The INRTU Technopark residents are 41 high-tech companies, which in 2020 carried out assignments for more than 800 million rubles. Various innovative infrastructure projects are successfully implemented at INRTU Technopark: student business accelerator, startup school for innovators "Taiga", startup school "Taiga. Junior", Irkutsk school of innovation managers and others.

International Partnerships
INRTU productively cooperates with 111 partners from 25 countries in Europe and Asia; has 138 agreements on cooperation, including 9 double degree programs with partner universities. Click the icon to learn more about the university and the program it offers.

Double degree and exchange programs are implemented in cooperation with more than 20 countries among which are Mongolia, China, Kazakhstan, Belarus, Republic of Korea and many others.

INRTU is a member of several international organizations:
	Association of Sino-Russian Technical Universities  
	Romualdo del Bianco Foundation   
	SUN – Silkroad University Network

References

External links 
Official website

Universities in Irkutsk Oblast
Engineering universities and colleges in Russia
National research universities in Russia